Bank of Melbourne is a financial institution operating in Victoria, Australia. A subsidiary of the Westpac Group, it was re-established as a separate entity, and re-commenced operations on 25 July 2011.

The "new" Bank of Melbourne initially rebadged the Victorian business of St.George Bank, another wholly owned subsidiary of Westpac, as part of a major local branding strategy. The customer-facing activities of the business operate independently of the Westpac Group. Westpac has owned Bank of Melbourne, and the rights to the brand, since its acquisition of the bank in 1997.

History 
The RESI Statewide Building Society was granted a banking licence and established the Bank of Melbourne in July 1989, listing it on the Australian Stock Exchange on 13 July 1989. In 1996, the bank acquired the Victorian business of Challenge Bank from Westpac.

On 3 April 1997, Westpac made a $1.43 billion bid to acquire the Bank of Melbourne; on 29 September 1997, holders of 96% of the ordinary shares of the Bank of Melbourne voted to approve the proposal. Conditions of approval for the takeover required Westpac to continue operating the entity as the Bank of Melbourne for three years.

The entity traded under that brand name until January 2004, at which point the brand name was replaced with Westpac.

In 2008, Westpac merged with the St.George Bank.

In 2011, Westpac relaunched a redesigned Bank of Melbourne brand, trading with the infrastructure and employees of St.George Bank in Victoria and led by Chief Executive Scott Tanner. Bank of Melbourne's logo is a navy blue shield, reflecting the architecture of Melbourne and Victoria's state colour. The logo was created by Ogilvy Australia and Designworks.

The bank has branches across metropolitan Melbourne and other primary urban centres including Geelong, Ballarat, Bendigo and Shepparton. It has a local executive team led by Chief Executive Mark Melvin, an Advisory Board chaired by prominent business figure Elizabeth Proust, and a CBD call centre to serve customers over the phone.

In 2015, Bank of Melbourne was announced as the anchor tenant in the Rialto's $100 million 'Mid town' redevelopment, timed to mark the 30th anniversary of the iconic skyscraper. The bank moved its head office to the redeveloped Rialto building on the corner of Collins and King Street in Melbourne's CBD in 2017.

See also

List of banks in Australia
Bank of Melbourne (1989)
St.George Bank
Westpac Banking Corporation

References 

Westpac
Banks of Australia
Banks established in 2011
Companies based in Melbourne